Miss Monaco or Miss Monte Carlo is a national beauty pageant for unmarried women in Monaco. The pageant was held several times in the 1950s, with the 1953 winner, Elizabeth Chovisky, placing 4th runner-up at Miss World 1953 as Miss Monte Carlo. In intervening years, contestant winners went on to compete in various unofficial Europe-wide contests.  Not all winners are documented.

In 2015 the preselection of contestants for the new edition of the Miss Monaco beauty pageant has started.

Winners
The results of the "unofficial" Miss Europe pageant, also known as the Miss Europa pageant, are poorly documented, But Miss Monaco placed in some years. The Miss Europa pageant was organized by the Comité Officiel et International Miss Europe, and the Mondial Events Organisation, which ran the official Miss Europe pageant until 2002, filed suit against the organization in 2000 over the pageant name.

References

External links
 

Beauty pageants in Europe
Monegasque awards